The 1980 Sugar Bowl was the 46th edition of the college football bowl game, played at the Louisiana Superdome in New Orleans, Louisiana, on Tuesday, January 1. Part of the 1979–80 bowl game season, it matched the undefeated and second-ranked Alabama Crimson Tide of the Southeastern Conference (SEC) and the #6 Arkansas Razorbacks of the Southwest Conference (SWC). Favored Alabama won  and gained their third national championship of the decade.

Teams

Alabama

Alabama entered the game undefeated, and had won two national championships already in the decade, in 1973 and 1978. Three of their conference victories in 1979 were by close margins, including a 3–0 win at LSU.

Arkansas

Led by head coach Lou Holtz, the Razorbacks entered the game at 10–1, sharing the SWC title with Houston. Greg Kolenda was an  offensive tackle and quarterback Kevin Scanlon was the Southwest Conference Player of the Year. The Hogs' defense gave up 9.8 points per game on the year, the sixth-best scoring defense in Division I.

Game summary
The game kicked off shortly after 1 p.m. CST, televised by ABC, at the same time as the Cotton Bowl on CBS.

Arkansas scored first in the first quarter, on a 34-yard Ish Ordonez field goal, to give the Razorbacks a 3–0 advantage. Alabama running back Major Ogilvie scored on touchdown runs of 22 and 1 yard and Alabama led 14–3 at the end of the first quarter. In the second quarter, Alan McElroy kicked a 25-yard field goal for the Crimson Tide, and they held a 17–3 advantage at halftime.

In the third quarter, Kevin Scanlon of Arkansas threw a 3-yard touchdown pass to Robert Farrell and the score tightened to 17–9. In the fourth quarter, Steve Whitman scored on a 12-yard run as Alabama won by a 24–9 margin. Ogilvie was named Sugar Bowl MVP. He rushed for a touchdown in three consecutive Sugar Bowls, all Crimson Tide victories.

Statistics
{| class=wikitable style="text-align:center"
! Statistics !!  Alabama  !! Arkansas
|-
|First downs ||18||21
|-
|Rushing yards||53–284||41–97
|-
|Passing yards||70||245
|-
|Passing ||4–7–2 ||22–40–2
|-
|Total offense ||60–354||81–342
|-
|Punts–average ||8–36.2||7–36.2
|-
|Fumbles–lost ||1–1||1–1
|-
|Turnovers||3||3
|-
|Penalties–yards ||7–61||1–15
|}

Aftermath
Later in the day at the Rose Bowl, Ohio State was defeated    For the first time since 1964, Alabama was voted to the top spot in  It was the Tide's first perfect season since 1966.

References

Sugar Bowl
Sugar Bowl
Alabama Crimson Tide football bowl games
Arkansas Razorbacks football bowl games
Sugar Bowl
Sugar Bowl